Gao Yang may refer to:

 Gao Yang clan 高陽氏 mentioned in the Zuo Zhuan, Wen Gong 18 (《文公十八年》)
 Zhuanxu the Chinese ruler, family name is Gao-Yang
 Emperor Wenxuan of Northern Qi, named Gao Yang
 Gao Yang (shot putter), shot putter
 Gao Yang (politician), former president of the Party School of the Central Committee of the Communist Party of China
 Gao Yang (speed skater)
 Gao Yang (snooker player)
 Gao-Yang Yue, a branch of the Yue group of Chinese